Battle of Arghandab may refer to:

 Battle of Arghandab (1987)
 Battle of Arghandab (2008)